Justice Griswold may refer to:

Matthew Griswold (governor), chief justice of the Superior Court of Connecticut
Roger Griswold, associate justice of the Connecticut Supreme Court